Voskhod is the name of several rural localities in Russia.

Altai Krai
As of 2010, four rural localities in Altai Krai bear this name:
Voskhod, Khabarsky District, Altai Krai, a settlement in Martovsky Selsoviet of Khabarsky District
Voskhod, Kosikhinsky District, Altai Krai, a settlement in Bayunovsky Selsoviet of Kosikhinsky District
Voskhod, Zalesovsky District, Altai Krai, a selo in Cheremushkinsky Selsoviet of Zalesovsky District
Voskhod, Zonalny District, Altai Krai, a settlement in Pleshkovsky Selsoviet of Zonalny District

Republic of Bashkortostan
As of 2010, two rural localities in the Republic of Bashkortostan bear this name:
Voskhod, Belokataysky District, Republic of Bashkortostan, a village in Tardavsky Selsoviet of Belokataysky District
Voskhod, Mishkinsky District, Republic of Bashkortostan, a village in Mishkinsky Selsoviet of Mishkinsky District

Chechen Republic
As of 2010, one rural locality in the Chechen Republic bears this name:
Voskhod, Chechen Republic, a settlement in Shelkovskoy District

Chelyabinsk Oblast
As of 2010, one rural locality in Chelyabinsk Oblast bears this name:
Voskhod, Chelyabinsk Oblast, a settlement in Belokamensky Selsoviet of Bredinsky District

Chuvash Republic
As of 2010, one rural locality in the Chuvash Republic bears this name:
Voskhod, Chuvash Republic, a settlement in Voskhodskoye Rural Settlement of Alatyrsky District

Republic of Kalmykia
As of 2010, one rural locality in the Republic of Kalmykia bears this name:
Voskhod, Republic of Kalmykia, a settlement in Voskhodovskaya Rural Administration of Oktyabrsky District

Kaluga Oblast
As of 1965, one rural locality in Kaluga Oblast bears this name:
Voskhod, Kaluga Oblast, a settlement in Voskhod Rural Territory of Zhukovsky District

Kemerovo Oblast
As of 2010, one rural locality in Kemerovo Oblast bears this name:
Voskhod, Kemerovo Oblast, a settlement in Plotnikovskaya Rural Territory of Promyshlennovsky District

Khabarovsk Krai
As of 2010, one rural locality in Khabarovsk Krai bears this name:
Voskhod, Khabarovsk Krai, a selo in Khabarovsky District

Krasnodar Krai
As of 2010, two rural localities in Krasnodar Krai bear this name:
Voskhod, Novokubansky District, Krasnodar Krai, a settlement in Kovalevsky Rural Okrug of Novokubansky District
Voskhod, Novopokrovsky District, Krasnodar Krai, a settlement in Pokrovsky Rural Okrug of Novopokrovsky District

Kurgan Oblast
As of 2010, one rural locality in Kurgan Oblast bears this name:
Voskhod, Kurgan Oblast, a selo in Voskhodsky Selsoviet of Mishkinsky District

Republic of Mordovia
As of 2010, one rural locality in the Republic of Mordovia bears this name:
Voskhod, Republic of Mordovia, a settlement in Voskhodsky Selsoviet of Staroshaygovsky District

Moscow Oblast
As of 2010, one rural locality in Moscow Oblast bears this name:
Voskhod, Moscow Oblast, a settlement within the closed administrative-territorial formation of the same name

Nizhny Novgorod Oblast
As of 2010, three rural localities in Nizhny Novgorod Oblast bear this name:
Voskhod, Bor, Nizhny Novgorod Oblast, a settlement in Pamyat Parizhskoy Kommuny Selsoviet of the city of oblast significance of Bor
Voskhod, Lyskovsky District, Nizhny Novgorod Oblast, a settlement in Berendeyevsky Selsoviet of Lyskovsky District
Voskhod, Varnavinsky District, Nizhny Novgorod Oblast, a settlement in Voskhodovsky Selsoviet of Varnavinsky District

Novgorod Oblast
As of 2010, one rural locality in Novgorod Oblast bears this name:
Voskhod, Novgorod Oblast, a village in Slavitinskoye Settlement of Volotovsky District

Novosibirsk Oblast
As of 2010, two rural localities in Novosibirsk Oblast bear this name:
Voskhod, Kolyvansky District, Novosibirsk Oblast, a settlement in Kolyvansky District
Voskhod, Novosibirsky District, Novosibirsk Oblast, a settlement in Novosibirsky District

Oryol Oblast
As of 2010, two rural localities in Oryol Oblast bear this name:
Voskhod, Khotynetsky District, Oryol Oblast, a settlement in Studenovsky Selsoviet of Khotynetsky District
Voskhod, Uritsky District, Oryol Oblast, a settlement in Kotovsky Selsoviet of Uritsky District

Perm Krai
As of 2010, one rural locality in Perm Krai bears this name:
Voskhod, Perm Krai, a village under the administrative jurisdiction of the city of krai significance of Chusovoy

Rostov Oblast
As of 2010, one rural locality in Rostov Oblast bears this name:
Voskhod, Rostov Oblast, a settlement in Yuzhnenskoye Rural Settlement of Martynovsky District

Ryazan Oblast
As of 2010, two rural localities in Ryazan Oblast bear this name:
Voskhod, Kadomsky District, Ryazan Oblast, a selo in Voskhodsky Rural Okrug of Kadomsky District
Voskhod, Sasovsky District, Ryazan Oblast, a village in Verkhne-Nikolsky Rural Okrug of Sasovsky District

Sakhalin Oblast
As of 2010, one rural locality in Sakhalin Oblast bears this name:
Voskhod, Sakhalin Oblast, a selo in Tymovsky District

Saratov Oblast
As of 2010, one rural locality in Saratov Oblast bears this name:
Voskhod, Saratov Oblast, a settlement in Balashovsky District

Sverdlovsk Oblast
As of 2010, one rural locality in Sverdlovsk Oblast bears this name:
Voskhod, Sverdlovsk Oblast, a settlement in Kamyshlovsky District

Tambov Oblast
As of 2010, one rural locality in Tambov Oblast bears this name:
Voskhod, Tambov Oblast, a settlement in Kobyakovsky Selsoviet of Kirsanovsky District

Republic of Tatarstan
As of 2010, one rural locality in the Republic of Tatarstan bears this name:
Voskhod, Republic of Tatarstan, a village in Leninogorsky District

Tula Oblast
As of 2010, one rural locality in Tula Oblast bears this name:
Voskhod, Tula Oblast, a village in Muravlyansky Rural Okrug of Kimovsky District

Tver Oblast
As of 2010, two rural localities in Tver Oblast bear this name:
Voskhod, Torzhoksky District, Tver Oblast, a village in Torzhoksky District
Voskhod, Vesyegonsky District, Tver Oblast, a village in Vesyegonsky District

Ulyanovsk Oblast
As of 2010, one rural locality in Ulyanovsk Oblast bears this name:
Voskhod, Ulyanovsk Oblast, a settlement in Pribrezhnensky Rural Okrug of Staromaynsky District

Vladimir Oblast
As of 2010, one rural locality in Vladimir Oblast bears this name:
Voskhod, Vladimir Oblast, a settlement in Kovrovsky District